Dale Frederick Nitzschke (born September 16, 1937) is an American academic. He was the president of the University of New Hampshire from 1990 to 1996, and of Marshall University from 1984 to 1990. He attended Loras College and Ohio University, and holds B.A., M.Ed. and Ph.D. degrees. He has taught at Ohio University, State University of College of Arts and Sciences at Plattsburgh, New York, the University of Northern Iowa, and University of Las Vegas.

References

External links
University of New Hampshire: Office of the President
Full list of University Presidents (including interim Presidents) , University of New Hampshire Library
"Guide to the Dale F. Nitzschke Papers, 1990-1994", University of New Hampshire Library

Living people
1937 births
Presidents of the University of New Hampshire
Presidents of Marshall University
Ohio University alumni
Loras College alumni